Tup Derakht (also Romanized as Tūp Derakht) is a village in Miyan Velayat Rural District, in the Central District of Mashhad County, Razavi Khorasan Province, Iran. At the 2006 census, its population was 211, in 53 families.

References 

Populated places in Mashhad County